Shana Goldberg-Meehan is an American television producer and television writer.

She was an executive producer of Friends and its spinoff Joey, which she also co-created along with Scott Silveri, whom she married in 2006 (they met when both were working on the Harvard Lampoon). In 2005, she left Joey while Silveri stayed on the show. In 2010, she created the series Better with You, which ended in 2011.

Goldberg-Meehan's father was comedy writer Gary David Goldberg, best known for creating Family Ties.

Filmography

References

External links
 

American television producers
American women television producers
American television writers
Living people
Jewish American screenwriters
American women television writers
Place of birth missing (living people)
Year of birth missing (living people)
The Harvard Lampoon alumni
21st-century American Jews
21st-century American women